In DC Comics' DC Universe, a metahuman is a human with superpowers. The term is roughly synonymous with both mutant and mutate in the Marvel Universe and posthuman in the Wildstorm and Ultimate Marvel Universes. In DC Comics, the term is used loosely in most instances to refer to any human-like being with extranormal powers and abilities, either cosmic, mutant, science, mystic, skill or tech in nature. A significant portion of these are normal human beings born with a genetic variant called the "metagene", which causes them to gain powers and abilities during freak accidents or times of intense psychological distress.

The term was first used as a reference to superheroes in 1986 by author George R. R. Martin, first in the Superworld role playing system, and then later in his Wild Cards series of novels.

DC Comics

The term was first used by a fictitious race of extraterrestrials known as the Dominators when they appeared in DC Comics' Invasion! mini-series in 1988. The Dominators use this term to refer to any human native of the planet Earth with "fictional superhuman abilities". The prefix "meta-" simply means "beyond", denoting powers and abilities beyond human limits. Metahuman may also relate to an individual who has exceeded what is known as "The Current Potential", meaning one's ability to move matter with mind. (See Telekinesis).

Xenobrood

Before the White Martians arrived on Earth, Lord Vimana, the Vimanian overlord from the Xenobrood mini-series, claimed credit for the creation of the human race both normal and metahuman, due to their introduction of superpowered alien genetic matter into human germline DNA. The Vimanians in the series forced their super powered worker drones to mate with humanity's ancestors Australopithecus afarensis (3 million years ago), and later Homo erectus (1.5 million years ago) in order to create a race of superpowered slaves.

The metagene
The Invasion! miniseries provided a concept for why humans in the DC Universe would survive catastrophic events and develop superpowers. One of the Dominators discovered that select members of the human race had a "biological variant," which he called the metagene (also spelled "meta-gene"). This gene often lay dormant until an instant of extraordinary physical and emotional stress activates it. A "spontaneous chromosomal combustion" then takes place, as the metagene takes the source of the biostress – be it chemical, radioactive or whatever – and turns the potential catastrophe into a catalyst for "genetic change," resulting in metahuman abilities. DC does not use the "metagene concept" as a solid editorial rule, and few writers explicitly reference the metagene when explaining a character's origin.

DC also has characters born with superhuman abilities, suggesting the metagene can activate spontaneously and without any prior appearance in the ancestry. One well-known example involves Dinah Laurel Lance, the second Black Canary. Although her mother (Dinah Drake Lance, the original Black Canary) was a superhero, neither she nor her husband Larry Lance were born with any known metagenes. However, Dinah Laurel was born with a metagene, the infamous ultrasonic scream known as the Canary Cry.

The prefix meta-, in this context, simply means "beyond"—as in metastable, which is beyond regular stability and ready to collapse at the slightest disruption, or metamorphosis, which is the state of going beyond a single shape. In the DC comic miniseries Invasion!, the Dominators point out that the metagene is contained inside every cell of the human body.

In the DC Comics universe, metahuman criminals are incarcerated in special metahuman prisons, like the prison built on Alcatraz Island, which is outfitted not only with provisions to hold criminals whose powers are science- and technology-based, but even mystical dampeners to hold villains (including Homo magi) whose powers are magic-based. Prisoners in this facility are tagged with nanobyte tracers injected into their bloodstream that allow them to be located wherever they are.

It is possible for individuals skilled in science and biology to manipulate, dampen or modify the activities of the metagene. During the Final Crisis, while the Dominators were devised a Gene Bomb able to accelerate the metagene activity to the point of cellular and physical instabilities, an anti-metagene virus was spread as a last-ditch weapon in the invaded Checkmate quarters. This metavirus has the opposite effects of the Gene Bomb, curbing and shutting down the metagene and stripping the metahumans of their powers for an unspecified amount of time.

White Martians

The genetic potential for a future metagene was discovered in ancient [[Archaic humans|Homo sapiens]] DNA (500,000 - 250,000 years ago) by the White Martian race. The White Martians performed experiments on these primitive humans, changing how the metahuman phenotype was expressed by the metagene.Martian Manhunter (vol. 2) #25-27 (December 2000-February 2001)

Due to their experiments, they altered the destiny of the human race. Whereas before, evolution would have eventually made mankind into a race of superhumans similar to the Daxamites and Kryptonians, now only a select few humans would develop metahuman powers. As punishment for this, the group of renegades known as the Hyperclan was exiled to the Still Zone, a version of the Phantom Zone.

Metavirus
The White Martians also created a metavirus, a metagene that could be passed from host to host via touch. This metavirus was responsible for the empowerment of the very first Son of Vulcan. From that time onwards, the Sons of Vulcan passed the metavirus down in an unbroken line, sworn to hunt and kill the White Martians.

Population
The terms "meta" and "metahuman" do not refer only to humans born with biological variants. Superman and the Martian Manhunter (aliens) as well as Wonder Woman (a near-goddess) and Aquaman (an Atlantean) are referred to in many instances as "metahumans." It can refer to anyone with extraordinary powers, no matter the origins and including those not born with such power. According to Countdown to Infinite Crisis, roughly 1.3 million metahumans live on Earth, 99.5% of whom are considered "nuisance-level" (such as kids who can bend spoons with their minds and the old lady "who keeps hitting at Powerball"). The other 0.5% are what Checkmate and the OMACs consider alpha-, beta- and gamma-level threats. For example, Superman and Wonder Woman are categorized as alpha-level, while Metamorpho is considered a beta-level and the Ratcatcher is considered a gamma-level. However, since the destruction of the Source Wall, the number of Alpha and Beta level metahumans, as well as the general metahuman population, were sharply increased by the new cosmic radiations affecting the universe.

Exo-gene
The 52 miniseries introduced a toxic mutagen called the Exo-gene (also referred to as the Exogene). It is a toxic gene therapy treatment created by LexCorp for the Everyman Project, which creates metahuman abilities in compatible non-metahumans. It first appeared in 52 #4, with the first announcement of the Everyman Project in 52 #8. The project was controversial, creating unstable heroes that gave Luthor an "off switch" for their powers, creating countless mid-flight deaths.

Dark Nights: Metal
In Road to Dark Nights: Metal, the Joker revealed to Duke Thomas that the term "meta" originated from a rudimentary hospital program used to automatically flag Nth metal toxicity found in a person's bloodstream, similar to iron or zinc, the “meta” being short for the "metal" it detected. This natural toxicity is the "variant" that changes the individual's DNA results in the metagene and its various heightened abilities and powers.

The lineage of metahumans and their origins can be traced by this Nth Metal connection, dating all the way back to three tribes from the earliest known era of humanity; the Bird Tribe, the Wolf Tribe and the Bear Tribe.

When the Totality crashed to Earth and introduced the various forms of Heavy Metal and other mysterious forces into the world, The Bear tribe and Vandar Adg of the Wolf Tribe were the first ones to encounter the Totality. They were all mutated by the radiation of the Totality, granting them immortality and making them the world's earliest iteration of metahumans. 

Marvel Comics
The word "metahuman" is often attributed to the DC Universe, while superhuman beings in the Marvel Universe are referred to as either mutants or mutates. However, both DC and Marvel Comics have made use of the term "metahuman" and "mutant" in their universes. The first use of the term 'metahuman' in the Marvel Universe occurred in New Mutants Annual #3, written by Chris Claremont, published in 1987, in which a Russian security officer describes the protagonists as "metahuman terrorists".

Amalgam Comics
In the short-lived DC/Marvel Comics "Amalgam Comics" crossover event, in JLX #1 (April 1996) (combining DC's Justice League and Marvel's X-Men), metahumans are replaced with metamutants (a portmanteau of DC's metahumans and Marvel's mutants) who are said to carry a 'metamutant gene'.

 In other media 
 Television 

DC animated universe
In the animated version of the DC universe, the term metahuman is used in the animated TV series Static Shock.

Birds of Prey
On the television series Birds of Prey, metahumans included heroines the Huntress and Dinah Lance. New Gotham has a thriving metahuman underground, mostly made of metahumans who are trying to live their own lives, although a self-hating metahuman, Claude Morton (Joe Flanigan), tries to convince the police that all metahumans are evil. In Birds of Prey, metahumans are treated seemingly as a race or species; the Huntress is described as being "half-metahuman" on her mother's side.

Smallville
On the television series Smallville, metahumans can occur naturally. However, the majority are the result of exposure to kryptonite, which in the Smallville universe can turn people into superpowered "meteor freaks'''", often with psychotic side effects. For many seasons of Smallville, all superpowered people other than Kryptonians were so-called meteor freaks, but as the show went on, it began to explore further corners of the DC Universe. Non-kryptonite metahumans include the Smallville versions of Aquaman, the Flash, the Black Canary, and Zatanna.

Young Justice
On the animated series Young Justice, the aliens known as the Kroloteans have frequently used the term and have even researched into the discovery of a "metagene" by abducting and testing on random humans. The alien reach conduct similar experiments and kidnap a cadre of teen runaways to test for the metagene, leading several of these individuals to develop superpowers. In the episode "Runaways," a S.T.A.R. Labs scientist surmises that the gene is "opportunistic" in as much as it causes its user to develop powers seemingly based on their personal experiences or surrounding depending on circumstances. In the third season a recurring plot-point is the trafficking of metahumans after humans learn to detect and activate metagene after the Reach invasion. In some cases, the metagene in some families is shown to be the source of similar abilities, as with Terra, Geo-Force, and their maternal uncle Baron Bedlam. In "Evolution", it is revealed Vandal Savage was the first metahuman because of the fallen meteor which bestowed him a healing factor and super-intelligence on Mongolia during the Pleistocene. Earth's metahumans, many Atlanteans, and all homo magi in Young Justice all trace their lineage to Savage.

Arrowverse
In the Arrowverse family of live-action shows, "metahuman" is used more narrowly than in the comics, typically referring to a human being who becomes transhuman and has uncanny abilities, often acquired following some kind of strange accident.
 In the 2014 television series The Flash, Dr. Harrison Wells and his team at Scientific and Technological Advanced Research Laboratories (S.T.A.R. Labs) developed an advanced particle accelerator in Central City. When it was activated, the device went critical and exploded, releasing a variety of theoretical elements such as dark matter and negative energy. Many Central City residents who were affected by the blast wave were genetically altered by the dark matter, granting them superhuman abilities. People with such abilities are called "metahumans," coined by Wells and his staff. The nature of a metahuman's powers appear to be a result of an external element that they were near or exposed to when hit by the blast. Eventually, under Harrison Wells and Cisco Ramon, S.T.A.R. Labs develops effective metahuman-power dampening technology and prison to confine metahumans. Over the course of the series, many more metahuman villains appear, including some from alternate universes or timelines and others who have no connection to the particle accelerator accident. In season three, S.T.A.R. Labs uses metahuman-detecting apps to alert the Flash's team to attacks; this technology is later used by city police and government agencies. In season five, Team Flash discovers meta-technology has been created following their battle with Thinker, resulting in any dark matter-powered device utilizing the power of a metahuman when wielded by anyone. Examples being Cicada's dagger enabling the user to negate metahuman abilities, Spin's smartphone enabling the user to control the minds of anyone through written hypnosis, Weather Witch's staff enabling the user to control the weather and teleport through lightning, and Silver Ghost's key fob enabling the user to control any motorized vehicles.
 After The Flash established the existence of metahumans, its sister series Arrow began to feature them, beginning with the arrival of metahuman villain Deathbolt in Starling City (later changed to Star City); the team learns that Deathbolt's powers were not derived from the particle accelerator blast, revealing the existence of metahumans from other means. Later on, the metahuman Double Down arrives in Star City to kill the Green Arrow and his teammates under the employment of the mystic Damien Darhk, though he fails to do so. Magical characters such as Darhk, Constantine, and Vixen recur in subsequent episodes, as well as occasional metahuman threats. 
 Arrow and Flash spin-off Legends of Tomorrow features numerous metahumans, including Hawkman, Hawkgirl, and Vandal Savage (introduced in an Arrow/Flash crossover), as well as characters from other Arrowverse shows. Later seasons introduce versions of Vixen, Isis, and Steel. 
 The television series Supergirl is set in a parallel universe to that of Arrow, The Flash, and Legends of Tomorrow, in which a variant of Earth where Supergirl resides is later coined as Earth-38 by Cisco Ramon. Humanity is aware of superpowered extraterrestrials such as Supergirl, her cousin Superman, and J'onn J'onzz, but the existence of metahumans is not widely known on Earth-38 until the first season's episode "Worlds Finest," a crossover with The Flash. In this episode, the Silver Banshee and Livewire publicly battle Supergirl and the Flash, revealing the case of transhuman beings with uncanny abilities in the process. Silver Banshee's powers are mystical in origin and nature, while Livewire's are from an anomalous mutagenic accident. Since the inhabitants of Supergirl's Earth have no experience with metahuman threats, the Flash provides National City's authorities with the means to combat and contain them before returning to his universe. Later, in season two's episode "We Can Be Heroes", shows that a prison facility at National City is using the Flash's world's (Earth-1) metahuman-power dampeners to restrain its transhuman prisoners; the technology is later used by Department of Extranormal Operations (DEO) and eventually they align with Earth-1's S.T.A.R. Labs. Human criminals begin experimenting on metahumans after the revelation of the possibility of transhumanism since their emergences in hopes of acquiring powers for themselves with goals to battle against extraterrestrial beings such as Supergirl, of which three metahumans were created with Livewire's powers. In season three, more metahumans begin to appear, including Psi, whose powers surface following her maturity. In season four, a serum developed by Lena Luthor, derived from a mineral from the planet Krypton called Harun-El (a black kryptonite), gives both Lex Luthor and James Olsen metahuman abilities including  superhuman strength and invulnerability equivalent to a Kryptonian's, accelerated healing process, and heightened senses.
 In the television series Black Lightning, sets in Arrowverse's Earth-73, Jefferson Pierce / Black Lightning and his daughters Anissa and Jennifer are metahumans. The A.S.A. are tracking young metahumans with abilities. As the series progresses, it is revealed that decades ago, because of the city of Freeland's prevailing racial and political conflicts, the A.S.A. developed a substance supposedly as a suppressant to turn its citizens docile in the interest of controlling them but failed. Instead, it turned out to be a mutagen which transforms some of its citizens into metahumans, including Jefferson Pierce and his daughters who inherited his metagene after his fatherhood. Under Martin Procter, the agency illegally developed an addictive derivative of the drug called Green Light, which is distributed as a recreational drug in hopes to create more metahumans for Procter's agendas. Because the metahumans are dying from unstable mutations, Procter seeks to capture Black Lightning and his offspring because they are the only known stable specimens of the agency's drug. After Procter's death, the A.S.A.'s experiments are exposed and Freeland's metahumans' origin has become a public knowledge. However, it ignites an anti-metahuman bigotry amongst the people in Freeland.

Gotham
In the television series Gotham, Professor Hugo Strange experiments with dead (and alive) bodies of criminals, Arkham Asylum patients, and civilians under the orders of the Court of Owls. There, Strange gives his victims superhuman abilities such as shapeshifting (Clayface), mind control (Fish Mooney) and super strength (Azrael). By the end of Season 2, Strange's victims escape and wreak havoc in the city. Throughout the series, the metahumans are commonly referred to as Strange's Monsters, simply Monsters (an allusion to the miniseries Dark Moon Rising: Batman & the Monster Men), or the Freaks from Indian Hill.

Film

DC Extended Universe
 In Batman v Superman: Dawn of Justice, Lex Luthor is stated to be a supporter of the "metahuman thesis." Secretly, he is already conducting studies on them, with particular interest on Wonder Woman, the Flash, Aquaman and Cyborg, all of whom he classifies as metahumans.
 Metahumans also appear in the movie Suicide Squad as Amanda Waller talks about their abilities when forming the squad. El Diablo, Killer Croc and Enchantress appear in the film, while its sequel The Suicide Squad features metahumans T.D.K (The Detachable Kid) and Polka-Dot Man.

See also
 List of metahumans in DC Comics
 Homo mermanus''
 Mutants and mutates, the Marvel Universe equivalents of metahumans
 Superhuman
 Superpower (ability)
 Transhumanism

References

External links
 DCU Guide History: 14 Million B.C.
 Monitor Duty: WILL D. WILLIAMS
 Wildcardsonline.com: Wild cards origins - Origin of the comic book term "Metahuman"
 Metahuman Press
 Metahumans from DC Comics Wikia
 Mutants & Mutates from Marvel Comics Wikia

Fictional elements introduced in 1986
 
DC Comics characters with superhuman strength
Superhero fiction themes
Transhumanism in fiction